Prolita solutella is a moth of the family Gelechiidae. It is widely distributed throughout Europe, east to the Ural mountains. It is also found in Turkey. The habitat consists of dry pastures and dry heathland.

The wingspan is 16–21 mm.

The larvae feed on Genista angelica, Genista pilosa, Genista tinctoria, Genista scoparius, and Cytisus species. They live in a silken tube or tent.

References

Moths described in 1839
Prolita
Moths of Europe
Insects of Turkey